RBI Monetary Museum or Reserve Bank of India Monetary Museum is a museum in Fort, Mumbai that covers the evolution of money in India, from the earliest barter system and the use of cowries to paper money, coins, stock markets and modern-day electronic transactions.

History
The museum was established under the educational programme by Reserve Bank of India, India's central bank, in 2004 and was inaugurated by A. P. J. Abdul Kalam, the then President of India. It was the first museum in the country devoted to economic history and numismatics.

The collection, divided into six sections, has about 1,500 objects that include coins dating back to 6th-century BCE and from Indus Valley, the Kushana Empire, the Gupta period and the British Raj; ancient paper money from across India, China and Southeast Asia; financial instruments; and other interactive exhibits. Entry to the museum is free.

References

External links

Museums of India – RBI Monetary Museum

Museums in Mumbai
Numismatic museums in India
Bank museums
History museums in India
Museums established in 2004
Buildings and structures completed in 2004
2004 establishments in Maharashtra
Art museums and galleries in India
Financial history of India
Subsidiaries of Reserve Bank of India